Xenorhina parkerorum is a species of frog in the family Microhylidae. It is endemic to New Guinea Highlands and occurs in both eastern Western New Guinea (Indonesia) and western Papua New Guinea. Common name Imigabip snouted frog has been proposed for it. The specific name parkerorum honours herpetologists Fred Parker and Hampton Wildman Parker.

Description
This species can reach   in snout–vent length. The body is broad and tapers to a relatively narrow head with pointed snout. The eyes are small. The tympanum is indistinct, but the supratympanic fold is well-developed. Low dorsolateral folds are present. Skin is dorsally pustulose and laterally more prominently so. The finger and toe tips bear distinct but only slightly enlarged discs. No webbing is present. The dorsum is brown, becoming noticeably darker on the top and sides of the head and tympanum. The sides of the head are flecked with white. The dorsolateral folds are darker brown than the surroundings, as are the low pustules of the back and sides. The groin is dark brown. The ventral surfaces are brown with faint lighter mottling and spotting. The throat is darker than the abdomen. Males have a single subgular vocal sac.

Habitat and conservation
It is uncommon and difficult to find; its specific habitat is unknown, but it is believed to live on the tropical rainforest floor. There are also records from rural gardens and other degraded areas. It presumably breeds by direct development (i.e, there is no free-living larval stage).

Threats to this species are unknown, but it occurs in an area where large tracts of suitable habitat exist; it also appears to adapt to habitat modification. It is present in the Kikori Integrated Conservation and Development Project Area.

References

parkerorum
Endemic fauna of New Guinea
Amphibians of Papua New Guinea
Amphibians of Western New Guinea
Amphibians described in 1972
Taxa named by Richard G. Zweifel
Taxonomy articles created by Polbot